La Guardia is a fishing and tourist community on the northwest coast of Isla Margarita, Venezuela.

Location

The bar is made of rocks and pebbles of different sizes and huge numbers of sea shells.
The bar also forms the northern shore of one of the largest bays in the world.

History

The original name was Caranta-maura, which means "great bay" in the guaiquerí language.
Later it was called Bufadero.
The first mention of this name is in a document dated 27 September 1754, when it is mentioned as a place on the coast. 
José de Matos y Rabel was appointed Governor of Margarita on 5 July 1764 and took office on 3 January 1765.
On 21 July 1765 he mentioned in a letter to the King of Spain that he had installed two guards at the location to protect the island from smuggling,
and this is the origin of the current name. 
The name Bufadero still appears in a map of Isla Margarita dated 15 June 1777, and there are records of sales of cattle at Bufaderos in 1794 and in 1802. 

The name "La Guardia" is relatively recent.  It is mentioned in a document of 24 February 1872 that Diego Romero had built three houses near the house of La Guardia in Bufadero, 
and this may be the origin of today's community. In 1899 the place was officially called Caserío (hamlet) La Guardia.
In 1915 it was renamed Zabala, but the official name is not widely used.

Activities

Many of the people are engaged in fishing.  Seafood includes mussels, oysters, octopus, mackerel and corocoro (gruntfish). 
The Virgin de María Auxiliadora is the patron saint of the town, and is celebrated on 24 May each year with processions, masses and events on the square in front of the church dedicated to the saint.  On 16 July each year the fishermen observe the day of the Virgen del Carmen, carrying her image in the long procession along the length of the bay.

Gallery

References
Citations

Sources

Margarita Island
Populated places in Nueva Esparta
Populated places established in 1765
Populated coastal places in Venezuela